Fairview is an unincorporated community in Green Township, Randolph County, in the U.S. state of Indiana.

History
Fairview was platted in 1838. A post office was established at Fairview in 1843, and remained in operation until it was discontinued in 1901.

Geography

References 

Unincorporated communities in Indiana
Unincorporated communities in Randolph County, Indiana